The Flower City Union is an American professional soccer team based in Rochester, New York, United States, that plays in the National Independent Soccer Association, a third tier league of the United States soccer league system. Its home stadium is Rochester Community Sports Complex Stadium.

History
In 2017, the long-time professional soccer team in Rochester, the USL's Rochester Rhinos, announced that they were going on hiatus as of the 2018 season. The departure of the Rhinos left Rochester without a professional soccer team for the first time since 1995 and left the team's stadium, Rochester Community Sports Complex Stadium, without a tenant in 2019. In 2020, an ownership group headed by David Weaver, the CEO and founder of Rochester-based Aphex BioCleanse Systems Inc. and a former Kodak optical engineer, submitted an application for a NISA team in Rochester. Mark Washo, a former Chief Business Officer with the Rhinos, was appointed as Managing Director and Chief Commercial Officer and the group later announced a partnership with St. John Fisher College’s Sport Management Department. In December 2020, NISA approved the group's expansion application, and soon after the team was unveiled as Flower City Union, a nod to Rochester's nickname as the Flower City. On April 14, 2021, the team logo and colors were introduced, the primary color being lilac purple in honor of Rochester's signature flower.

In 2022, the club began play. They merged with the Syracuse Pulse to form a single club that would split home matches between Rochester (as Flower City Union) and Syracuse (as Salt City Union).

Players

Current roster

Seasons

References

External links
 

Association football clubs established in 2021
Men's soccer clubs in New York (state)
National Independent Soccer Association teams
2021 establishments in New York (state)